XHMZO-FM is a radio station on 92.9 FM in Manzanillo, Colima, broadcasting from Cerro del Toro. The station is known as Radio Turquesa and carries a pop format.

History
XHMZO received its concession on June 28, 1989, and has maintained the same concessionaire throughout. The station signed on November 12, 1990.

References

Radio stations in Colima